Cristian Castells Ortega (born 19 October 1984) is a Spanish footballer who plays as a central defender.

Club career
Castells was born in Sueca, Valencia. An unsuccessful youth graduate of Valencia CF, he spent most of his career in the Segunda División B, also having Segunda División spells with Polideportivo Ejido and Alicante CF, both ended in relegation.

Midway through the 2012–13 season, at already 28, Castells had his first top-flight experience, when he signed for Platanias F.C. in the Super League Greece. In January 2014, however, after only six competitive matches, he returned to his country and his native region, joining amateurs CF Cullera. 

Castells rarely settled in the following years, representing Spanish amateur clubs and professional teams in Romania (Liga II) and Northern Ireland. Early into the 2018–19 campaign, he served as manager of CF Torre Levante in the Tercera División.

Personal life
Castells' younger brother, Marc, was also a footballer. A midfielder, he also represented Poli Ejido, but spent the vast majority of his career in the lower leagues.

References

External links

1984 births
Living people
People from Ribera Baixa
Sportspeople from the Province of Valencia
Spanish footballers
Footballers from the Valencian Community
Association football defenders
Segunda División players
Segunda División B players
Tercera División players
Divisiones Regionales de Fútbol players
Valencia CF Mestalla footballers
CD Eldense footballers
Villajoyosa CF footballers
Polideportivo Ejido footballers
Alicante CF footballers
Deportivo Alavés players
UD Melilla footballers
Pontevedra CF footballers
Burgos CF footballers
CF Torre Levante players
Super League Greece players
Platanias F.C. players
Liga II players
CSM Ceahlăul Piatra Neamț players
League of Ireland players
Derry City F.C. players
Spanish expatriate footballers
Expatriate footballers in Greece
Expatriate footballers in Italy
Expatriate footballers in Romania
Expatriate association footballers in Northern Ireland
Spanish expatriate sportspeople in Greece
Spanish expatriate sportspeople in Italy
Spanish expatriate sportspeople in Romania
Spanish football managers
Tercera División managers